Kornstad is a village in Averøy Municipality in Møre og Romsdal county, Norway.  The village is located on the west side of the island of Averøya, along the Kornstadfjorden.  Kornstad Church is located in this village.  The village of Visnes (in Eide Municipality) lies directly across the fjord from Kornstad.

The village of Kornstad was the administrative centre of the old Kornstad Municipality from 1897 until 1964 when the municipality was dissolved.

References

Villages in Møre og Romsdal
Averøy